The Nawa River is a river in Western New Guinea. It is the major northern tributary of the Taritatu River, which it forms where it merges with the Sobger River.

See also
List of rivers of Western New Guinea
Nawa River languages

References

Rivers of Papua (province)